Blood Heir is a 2019 debut young adult novel by Amélie Wen Zhao, published by Delacorte Press. Prior to its publication, the book was subject to controversy due to accusations of racial insensitivity and plagiarism; Zhao subsequently decided to postpone its publication. The controversy received widespread media coverage, including write-ups in The New York Times, Slate, Vulture, and The New Yorker. Blood Heir was published in November 2019.

Background
Zhao, a Chinese woman who had immigrated to the United States at age of 18, matched with her literary agent after participating in a budding author event on Twitter for writers of marginalized backgrounds. Her proposed fantasy series sold at auction, reportedly for a high six-figure deal. The initial date of publication was to be June 2019. Circa January 2019, while revision of the book was underway, several users on Twitter accused the author of writing a book that lacked sensitivity towards African-Americans, based upon passages about slaves being sold at an auction. There were also accusations of plagiarism.

The author issued an apology and asked the publisher to not publish at the time. According to Zhao, the slavery passages were based on examples of indentured labor and human trafficking in Asia, including from her native country, rather than American slavery. Aja Hoggatt of Slate wrote that the plagiarism accusations had "barely" any merit. Katy Waldman of The New Yorker wrote that "[i]f anything, the damning readings of Blood Heir seem guilty of something that the Y.A. community mitigates against: the misapprehension of a cultural context unfamiliar to one’s own."

In April 2019, Zhao announced that the publication had been rescheduled. Despite her views on the prior criticism, she made further revisions; editor Krista Marino stated that they "worked to further establish the nuances of indentured labor and trafficking within this fantasy world, without changing major plot points." The publisher asked people who were to examine the work for possible representations of racial groups which would upset readers, and also asked scholars to review it.

Release and reception 
Blood Heir was released in November 2019. In its review of the novel, Kirkus Reviews concluded that there was "no new ground broken," but that it was "a good read for those looking for bloody action and twisty politics." Publishers Weekly wrote that "Zhao’s plot imperils its protagonists time and again, leading the arc to feel repetitive and the protagonists less than capable," concluding that the novel "may garner readership despite the melodrama."

See also

 Diversity in young adult fiction

References

2019 American novels
American young adult novels
Race-related controversies in literature
Novels involved in plagiarism controversies
2019 debut novels
Delacorte Press books